MTV 80s is a worldwide music channel, which began broadcasting on October 5, 2020. MTV 80s features music videos from the 1980s. MTV 80s has replaced VH1 Classic.

History

Before launch 
On November 30, 2004, VH1 Classic Europe featured a program with 1980s music videos, "So 80s", after the launch of this channel. Since December 2005, VH1 Classic Europe featured thematic programs with clips from the 1980s:
 The 80s Alternative - Alternative and obscure videos from the 1980s.
 The 80s Chilled - Laid back music from the 1980s.
 The 80s Danced - Dance music from the 1980s.
 The 80s Partied - Disco, funk and party music from the 1980s.
 The 80s Popped - Pop music from the 1980s.
 The 80s Rocked - Rock music from the 1980s.
 The 80s Years - A selection of music videos from one particular year of the 1980s.

On September 4, 2006, "So 80s" was renamed to "We Are The 80s". In 2007, VH1 Classic Europe started broadcasting a morning program with 80s music videos - "The 80s At 8" - from 08:00 to 09:00 CET. On July 1, 2012, VH1 Classic Europe cancelled all of these programs. In April 2015, VH1 Classic Europe started a marathon of 80s music videos – "Nothing But The 80s", which was released every three weeks – on weekends. On  January 8, 2018, another program appeared on VH1 Classic Europe - "80s Boys vs 80s Girls". At the end of June 2018, on VH1 Classic Europe  discontinued "80s Boys vs 80s Girls", and in September of this year, "Nothing But The 80s" was also cancelled. In April 2020, VH1 Classic Europe cancelled "We Are The 80s", in connection with the move of MTV 80s to the frequency of this channel, which was previously broadcast on MTV Classic UK.

Pop-up channel and launch 
From February 28 to March 31, 2020, MTV 80s was broadcast for one month as a themed alternative to its host channel, MTV Classic UK, but was not planned as a full-time replacement. From June 31, 2020, until October 5, 2020, VH1 Classic Europe broadcast a block of MTV 80s programming from midnight until midday as a test bed for what would eventually become the permanent replacement to VH1 Classic Europe.

Since July 6, 2020, MTV 80s broadcasts in New Zealand around the clock replacing MTV Classic (Australia).
On October 5, 2020, from 05:00 CET onwards, MTV 80s started broadcasting full time, replacing VH1 Classic in Europe, Latin America and the Caribbean. The last video to be broadcast on VH1 Classic Europe was "Born to Run" by Bruce Springsteen. The first video on MTV 80s channel was "Never Let Me Down Again" by Depeche Mode at 05:00 CET.
Captions with the name of the song, album and the executor of music video are stylised in the same way that would have been used in the 1980s.
On March 1, 2021, MTV 80s expanded its broadcast area to the Middle East and North Africa through beIN Network.

Other versions
As part of restructuring at Paramount Global UK & Australia, MTV 80s replaced MTV Classic in the UK from 6am on March 31, 2022.

The format 
Since its launch, MTV 80s has been broadcasting in the format of the British music channel Now 80s. Unlike Now 80s, MTV 80s doesn't broadcast any announcements nor commercial advertising.

MTV 80s uses the same equipment become outdated for broadcasting of programs, as the former VH1 Classic had. It is the only MTV channel which broadcasts in the 4:3 format.

Programmes

Regular programming
 ...So 80s!
 Non-Stop 80s Hits!
 Gold! Greatest Hits Of The 80s
 Forever 80s!

Daily specials

 80s Power Ballad Heaven!
 Electric 80s!
 Greatest 80s Rock: Play it Loud!
 I Want My MTV 80s!
 Pump Up The 80s Party!
 The Power of 80s Love!
 Who's That 80s Girl?
 Wild Boys Of The 80s!

Top 50

 Best 80s Debuts!
 Global No. 1s of the 80s!
 Greatest Voices of the 80s!
 Lessons in 80s Love!
 The Power of 80s Love!
 Super 80s Pops Hits!
 Hits Of 1980!
 Hits Of 1981!
 Hits Of 1982!
 Hits Of 1983!
 Hits Of 1984!
 Hits Of 1985!
 Hits Of 1986!
 Hits Of 1987!
 Hits Of 1988!
 Hits Of 1989!
 Tell It To My Heart! Girls in Love
 Greatest Love of All!
 50 Greatest Female Voices Of the 80s!
 Divas Of The 80s!

Special
 Eddie Van Halen: A Tribute
 Christine McVie: A Tribute
 De La Soul's David Jolicoeur: A Tribute

Yearly events

Valentine's Day
 80s In Love!

Women's Day
Non-Stop 80s Wonder Women!
I Want My MTV 80s Wonder Women!
Forever 80s Girls!
80s Women Rock! (alt. name: "80s Women Rock: Play it Loud!")

Europe Day

Biggest Euro Hits of the 80s!
Pump Up the Euro Pop Party!

Men's Day
Non-Stop 80s Men!
I Want My MTV 80s Men!
Forever 80s Boys!
80s School Of Rock The Boys!

New Year
 Happy New Year From MTV 80s!
 Pump Up The New Year Party!
 It's An 80s New Year's Party!

Other

August 2022
Dance
 Rhythm is Gonna Get Ya! 80s Dance Party

Discontinued
 80s Legends!
 80s Pop Anthems!
 Best 80s Debut Hits!
 MTV 80s Top 50
 Iconic 80s Videos That Made MTV!
 40 MTV 80s
 MTV 80s At The Movies!
 Super 80s Pop Hits!
 MTV's Sounds Of (1980-1989)
 Top 50
 at the Movies!
 80s Classics That Made MTV!
 Boys vs Girls of the 80s!
 Feelgood 80s Anthems!
 No Solo: Only 80s Groups!
 1980 vs. 1981!
 1982 vs. 1986!
 1983 vs. 1987!
 1984 vs. 1988!
 1985 vs. 1989!
 Biggest Euro Hits of the 80s!
 Videos That Made the Decade!
 MTV VMA's Hall Of 80s Fame!
 Dance Dance Dance! 50 Best Moves Of the 80s!
 Happy Hits Of the 80s!
 80s R&B: Top Hits! 50
 The Final 80s Rockdown!
 Alternative 80s!
 Boys Boys Boys: 50 Pop Hits!
 School of Rock: The Boys!
 Unforgettable 80s Music Videos!

Notes 
 MTV plans to change the names of its three TV channels (in Russian)
 VH1 Classic - program for 21.09.2020 (in Polish)
 VH1 Classic stops after 21 years (in Dutch)
 End of VH1 Classic and MTV Rocks, replaced by MTV 80s and MTV 90s (in Polish)
 "MTV 80s" program on the first day of broadcasting on the "MTV Classic UK" frequency
 MTV 80S INTERNATIONAL PREMIERE IN OCTOBER AND PLAY IT LOUD THROUGH THE DISTRIBUTION PLATFORMS " SAT/CABLE / IP AND OTT”! (in Greek)

References

External links 
 Screenshots of the TV channel "MTV 80s" on the frequency "MTV Classic UK" on itzaps.net
 Screenshots of the TV channel "MTV 80s" on the frequency "MTV Classic UK" on VK.com
Screenshots of the TV channel "MTV 80s" on the frequency "VH1 Classic Europe" on itizaps.net
Screenshots of the TV channel "MTV 80s" on the frequency "VH1 Classic Europe" on VK.com
Screenshots of the TV channel "MTV 80s" on itzaps.net
Screenshots of the TV channel "MTV 80s" (4:3) on VK.com

MTV channels
Television channels and stations established in 2020
Television channels in the Netherlands
Television channels in North Macedonia
Television stations in Malta
Classic television networks